Lewisham West and Penge is a constituency in Greater London created in 2010 and represented in the House of Commons of the UK Parliament since 2017 by Ellie Reeves of the Labour Party.

History
Following the adoption of the Boundary Commission's Fifth Periodic Review of Westminster constituencies this constituency was created for the 2010 general election with electoral wards from the London Boroughs of Bromley and Lewisham. The greater electorate and area of the constituency is in the London Borough of Lewisham.

Political history
At the 2010 general election the Liberal Democrat challenge edged the Conservative candidate narrowly into third.  The 2015 Liberal Democrat candidate moved into fifth position on results night.

Labour held the seat in the 2019 general election, with a reduced share of the vote 31,860. The Conservatives came second and the Liberal Democrats achieved third place.

Constituency profile
The seat comprises the south-western portion of Lewisham borough with the northwestern tip of Bromley borough. At the heart of the seat is Sydenham, with most of Forest Hill in the north. Its ambit also includes some of the Crystal Palace and Sydenham Hill (the park and site of the palace itself is on the intersection of five boroughs) and the nearby areas of Anerley and Penge. The Guardian summarised it in 2010 as "suburban south-east London, with a large Afro-Caribbean population."

Boundaries

The seat covers the following electoral wards: Bellingham; Forest Hill; Perry Vale; Sydenham (London Borough of Lewisham) and Clock House; Crystal Palace; Penge & Cator (London Borough of Bromley).

To create the new constituency the Boundary Commission for England transferred Perry Vale ward, Bellingham ward, Forest Hill ward, and Sydenham ward from the former Lewisham West constituency. Clock House ward, Crystal Palace ward, and Penge and Cator ward were transferred from Beckenham constituency.

Members of Parliament

Election results

Elections in the 2010s

See also
Lewisham West (UK Parliament constituency)
 List of parliamentary constituencies in London

Notes

References

External links 
Politics Resources (Election results from 1922 onwards)
Electoral Calculus (Election results from 1955 onwards)

Politics of the London Borough of Lewisham
Politics of the London Borough of Bromley
Parliamentary constituencies in London
Constituencies of the Parliament of the United Kingdom established in 2010